Kent McKay Anderson (born August 12, 1963) is an American former professional baseball player. He played in Major League Baseball (MLB) as an infielder from 1989 to 1990. Anderson graduated from Hudgens Academy High School in 1981 and was drafted in the 4th round of the 1984 Major League Baseball draft by the California Angels.
In parts of two big league seasons, he batted .260/.318/.311. He is the brother of former MLB outfielder Mike Anderson.

References

External links

Kent Anderson at SABR (Baseball BioProject)

1963 births
Living people
American expatriate baseball players in Canada
Baseball players from South Carolina
Calgary Cannons players
California Angels players
Edmonton Trappers players
Indianapolis Indians players
Iowa Cubs players
Major League Baseball shortstops
Major League Baseball third basemen
Palm Springs Angels players
Peoria Chiefs players
Redwood Pioneers players
South Carolina Gamecocks baseball players
Sportspeople from Florence, South Carolina